The men's 800 metres event at the 2013 Summer Universiade was held on 10–12 July.

Medalists

Results

Heats
Qualification: First 3 in each heat and 6 best performers advanced to the semifinals.

Semifinals
Qualification: First 2 in each heat and 2 best performers advanced to the final.

Final

References 

800
2013